Mehran Derakhshan Mehr (born 10 August 1998) is an Iranian footballer who currently plays for Foolad in the Persian Gulf Pro League.

Club career

Zob Ahan
He joined Zob Ahan in the winter break of 2014–15 Season

Club career statistics

International career

U20
He is part of Iran U–20 during 2012 AFC U-19 Championship qualification, 2012 CIS Cup, 2012 AFF U-19 Youth Championship and 2012 AFC U-19 Championship.

Honours

Club
Zob Ahan
Hazfi Cup (2): 2014–15, 2015–16
Iranian Super Cup (1): 2016

Foolad
Hazfi Cup (1): 2020–21
Iranian Super Cup: 2021

References

1998 births
Living people
Iranian footballers
Zob Ahan Esfahan F.C. players
Foolad FC players
Persian Gulf Pro League players
Sportspeople from Isfahan
Iran under-20 international footballers
Association football midfielders